Opus 1 is the debut and only studio album by Yugoslav progressive rock band Opus, released in 1975.

Recording and release
The band Opus, formed and led by organist Miodrag Okrugić, from its formation in 1973 until the final breakup in 1979 went through two breakups and reformations and numerous lineup changes. Opus 1 was recorded after the band's first reformation, in 1975, in the lineup which, beside Okrugić, featured Slobodan Orlić (a former Siluete members, bass guitar), Ljubomir Jerković (drums), and Dušan Prelević (a former Korni Grupa member, vocals). The album was recorded during August 1975, in PGP-RTB's Studio V. The album, released in luxurious sleeve designed by Dragan S. Stefanović, featured symphonic rock-oriented sound.

The song "Opus / Žena tame", was previously, under the name "Opus No.1", performed by Okrugić's former band YU Grupa, but never recorded. The song "Memento Mori" featured Dah leader Zlatko Manojlović on vocals.

Track listing
All songs written by Miodrag Okrugić, except where noted.

Personnel
Miodrag Okrugić - organ, piano
Slobodan Orlić - bass guitar
Ljubomir Jerković - drums
Dušan Prelević - vocals

Additional personnel
Zlatko Manojlović - vocals (on track B4)
Aleksandar Pilipenko - producer
Dušan Vojković - engineer
Tahir Durkalić - engineer
Dragan S. Stefanović - design

Reception
The album was not well received by the critics, who expected more from the band on the basis of their live performances. The same year Opus 1 was released, Opus disbanded (reforming in 1977).

Reissue
In 2013, Opus 1 was reissued on both CD and vinyl by Austrian record label Atlantide.

Legacy
In 2015 Opus 1 album cover was ranked 22nd on the list of 100 Greatest Album Covers of Yugoslav Rock published by web magazine Balkanrock.

References

External links
Opus 1 at Discogs
Opus 1 at Diskos official YouTube channel

Opus (Yugoslav band) albums
1975 albums